Saint Alexius (Алекси́й or Aleksij in Russian) (before 1296–1378) was Metropolitan of Kiev and all Russia (from 1354), and presided over the Moscow government during Dmitrii Donskoi's minority.

Biography

Alexius, whose name at birth was Eleutherius, was a son of Фе­о­до­р (Theodore) Biakont and Mary, his father was a boyar from Chernigov who settled in Moscow and founded the great Pleshcheev boyar family. He took monastic vows at the Epiphany Monastery of Moscow around 1313, at which time he was given the religious name of Alexius. In 1333 or so, he joined the household of Metropolitan Theognostus. In 1340, Alexius was appointed the Metropolitan's deputy in Vladimir and twelve years later was consecrated as Bishop of Vladimir.

By the will of Symeon the Proud, Alexius was appointed adviser to his brothers – Ivan and Andrew. After visiting Constantinople, he was chosen to become the Metropolitan of Moscow and all Russia in 1354. When Dmitry Donskoy and Vladimir the Bold were young, Alexius was their spiritual tutor and served as regent at the same time. He took the side of Dmitrii Donskoi in his struggle against Tver and Nizhny Novgorod, where he once sent St. Sergius of Radonezh to suspend divine service in churches and monasteries, until the political strife was over.

In 1357, Alexius was summoned by Jani Beg, the Khan of the Golden Horde, to cure his mother Taydula Khatun of blindness. The metropolitan's success is held to have prevented a Tatar raid on Moscow.

In 1360s, Alexius founded the Andronikov, Chudov, and Alekseyevsky monasteries. He promoted Metropolitan Peter's canonization by the Russian Orthodox Church. Shortly before his death, Alexius fruitlessly tried to convince Sergius of Radonezh to become his successor. Alexius was an author of a number of sermons and epistles. He was canonized by the Russian Orthodox Church in 1448 and is revered as one of the patron saints of Moscow.

Feast Days 
12 February, (the day of his repose), 20 May, (the day of the uncovering of his relics) and 5 October, (Synaxis of the Hierarchs of Moscow). His relics are venerated in Ephiphany Cathedral in Elokhovo.

Popular culture
The 2012 film The Horde is a highly fictionalised narrative of how Alexius healed Taidula from blindness.

References

External links
St Alexis the Metropolitan of Moscow and Wonderworker of All Russia

13th-century births
1296 births
1378 deaths
Metropolitans of Kiev and all Rus' (988–1441)
Russian saints of the Eastern Orthodox Church
Miracle workers
13th-century Christian saints